Kasheh or Kesheh may refer to:
 Kesheh, Isfahan
 Kasheh, Markazi